Phereoeca is a genus of moths belonging to the family Tineidae. The larvae of these moths build protective silk cases and some are moderate household pests.

Tineidae
Tineidae genera